Kristo Tohver (born 11 June 1981) is an Estonian international referee who refereed at 2014 FIFA World Cup qualifiers.

Tohver has also served as a referee at the 2012-13 UEFA Europa League, the 2011 UEFA European Under-17 Football Championship, and qualifiers for other junior-level UEFA competitions, including the 2013 UEFA Under-21 championship.

References

1981 births
Living people
Estonian football referees
UEFA Champions League referees
UEFA Europa League referees